Tim Eekman (born 5 August 1991) is a Dutch professional footballer who plays for BVV Barendrecht in the Dutch Derde Divisie.

Club career
He formerly played for Excelsior and joined amateur side Barendrecht in summer 2014.

References

External links

1991 births
Living people
Footballers from Ridderkerk
Association football fullbacks
Dutch footballers
Excelsior Rotterdam players
BVV Barendrecht players
Kozakken Boys players
Eredivisie players
Eerste Divisie players
Tweede Divisie players
Derde Divisie players